Sauer is a German surname. Notable people with this surname (or Sauers) include:

Persons

A–J
Albert Sauer (1898–1945), German Nazi SS concentration camp commandant
August Sauer (1855–1926), Austrian Germanist and literary historian
Bernard Sauer (1924–1991), US stage actor
Carl O. Sauer (1889–1975), US geographer
Christoph Sauer (1695–1758), German-born US printer and publisher
Colin Sauer (1924–2015), violinist and chamber musician
Conrad Frederick Sauer (1866–1927), US pharmacist, founder of C.F. Sauer Company
Craig Sauer (born 1973), US football player
Dirk Sauer (born 1977), German-born musician
Ed Sauer (1919–1988), US baseball player
Eddie Sauer (1898–1980), US football player
Emil von Sauer (1862–1942), German musician and composer
Frank Sauer, Canadian football player
Frederick C. Sauer (1860–1942), German-born US architect
Gene Sauers (born 1962), US golfer
Geoffrey Sauer (born 1968), US educator
George Sauer (1910–1994), US football player and coach
George Sauer Jr. (1943–2013), US football player
Gunnar Sauer (born 1964), German footballer
Gustavo Sauer (born 1993), Brazilian footballer
Hank Sauer (1917–2001), US baseball player
Hans Sauer (1857–1939), South African born medical doctor, lawyer, adventurer and businessman
Isidor Sauers (born 1948), Austrian-born US physicist
Jeff Sauer (1943–2017), American ice hockey player and coach
Joachim Sauer (born 1949), German scientist
Johannes Sauer (born 1968), South African-born Canadian sport shooter
John Sauer (1925–1996), US football player and coach
Jonathan Deininger Sauer (1918–2008), American botanist and plant geographer
Julia Sauer (1891–1983), American writer of children's fiction and librarian
June Sauer (born 1920s), Canadian fashion photographer

K–Z
Kai Sauer (born 1967), Finnish diplomat
Klaus Peter Sauer (1941–2022), German biologist
Kurt Sauer (born 1981), US ice hockey player
Louie Sauer (1915–1985), American basketball player
Louis Sauer (born 1928), US architect
Louis W. Sauer (1885–1980), US medical doctor, developer of pertussis vaccine
Magdalena Sauer (1890–1983), first woman qualified to practice as an architect in South Africa
Mark Sauer, American physician who specializes in reproductive medicine
Martin Sauer (explorer) ( 1785–1806), English civil servant, stockbroker and explorer
Martin Sauer (rowing), (born 1982), German rowing cox
Mary Sauer (born 1975), US pole vaulter
Matt Sauer (born 1999), American baseball player
Maximilian Sauer (born 1994), German footballer
Michael Sauer (athlete) (born 1941), German triple jumper
Michael Sauer (ice hockey) (born 1987), US ice hockey player
Michael T. Sauer (born 1937), US judge
Mike Sauer (wine), Washington wine grower
Nick Sauer (born 1982), Republican politician
Norman Sauer, American forensic anthropologist
Paige Sauer (born 1977), basketball player
Peter Sauer (1900–1949), Russian-born US wrestler
Ralph Sauer ( 1970s–2000s), US musician
Robert Max Friedrich Sauer (1898–1970), German mathematician
Robert T. Sauer (born 1948), American biochemist
Sascha Sauer (born 1981), German American football player
Stefan Sauer (born 1966), German politician
Uwe Sauer (born 1943), German equestrian athlete
Uwe Sauer (basketball) (born 1963), German basketball player
Volker Sauer (born 1956), German rower
Wilhelm Sauer (1831–1916), German pipe organ builder

See also
Saur (disambiguation)

German-language surnames
Surnames from nicknames